The Mixed Doubles tournament of the 2014 BWF World Junior Championships was held on April 13–18.

Huang Kaixiang and Chen Qingchen from China clinched the title for 2 years in a row after won another final against Indonesian pair, this time Muhammad Rian Ardianto and Rosyita Eka Putri Sari by 21-12 21-17. For Indonesia this was the fourth straight years they were in the final of mixed double.

Seeded

  Huang Kaixiang / Chen Qingchen (champion)
  Kim Jung-ho / Kim Hye-jeong (third round)
  Kim Jae-hwan / Kong Hee-yong (third round)
  Dechapol Puavaranukroh / Puttita Supajirakul (quarter-final)
  He Jiting / Du Yue (quarter-final)
  Ben Lane / Jessica Pugh (third round)
  Ryan Ng Zin Rei / Elaine Chua Yi Ling (fourth round)
  Rafiddias Akhdan Nugroho / Zakia Ulfa (fourth round)
  Rodion Alimov / Alina Davletova (third round)
  Alexander Bond / Ditte Soby Hansen (third round)
  Ruben Jille / Alida Chen (fourth round)
  Kenya Mitsuhashi / Chiharu Shida (third round)
  Bernard Ong Soon Yang / Yeo Jiamin (fourth round)
  Yuta Watanabe / Arisa Higashino (semi-final)
  Wu Yuan-cheng / Chang Ching-hui (third round)
  Yang Ming-tse / Pan Tzu-chin (third round)

Draw

Finals

Top Half

Section 1

Section 2

Section 3

Section 4

Bottom Half

Section 5

Section 6

Section 7

Section 8

References
Main Draw

Mixed
2014 in youth sport
World Junior